Euchomenella macrops is a species of praying mantis in the family Deroplatyidae.

This "giraffe mantis" species can be found in the tropical forests of southern Vietnam.  Females are brachypterous but males are capable of flight.

References

External links 
 

Deroplatyinae
Insects of Vietnam